Stephanie Angela Elizabeth Seich (born June 13, 1989) is an American artistic gymnast. She was born in New Brunswick, New Jersey.

She was 18th in all-around at the U.S. Championships in 2004 for Junior Women. She competed for the Nebraska Cornhuskers. She graduated Abeka Academy in 2007.

References

External links 
 Cornhuskers profile

Living people
1989 births
American female artistic gymnasts
Sportspeople from New Brunswick, New Jersey
21st-century American women